Mondolfo is a comune (municipality) in the Province of Pesaro e Urbino in the Italian region Marche, located about  northwest of Ancona and about  southeast of Pesaro, on the Adriatic Sea.  
  
Mondolfo borders the following municipalities: Castel Colonna, Fano, San Costanzo, Senigallia,  Trecastelli.

History
Human presence is testified by remains from as early as the Neolithic Age. However, the first stable settlement appeared starting from the early 11th century, around a Byzantine castle existing here in the 6th-7th  centuries.

Main sights
Church of San Gervasio 
Sant'Agostino  church (1586–93) and convent (17th century)
Santa Giustina  church (completed around 1760) 
San Sebastiano (1479), housing the Ceccarini altarpiece
Church of San Giovanni (17th century) 
Palazzo Giraldi Della Rovere (16th century) 
Palazzo Peruzzi (16th century)   
Sanctuary of the Madonna delle Grotte (1682)

References

External links

Official website

Cities and towns in the Marche